José Horácio Costa was the second president (governor) of the Brazilian state of Espírito Santo.  He was the legal substitute of the former governor, Afonso Cláudio de Freitas Rosa.  Both were appointed by the President of Brazil, Marshall Manuel Deodoro da Fonseca, as governor and vice-governor.

Governors of Espírito Santo
Year of death missing
Year of birth missing